Lawton Walter "Whitey" Witt (born Ladislaw Waldemar Wittkowski, September 28, 1895 – July 14, 1988) was an American professional baseball outfielder. He played all or part of ten seasons in Major League Baseball (MLB) with the Philadelphia Athletics, New York Yankees, and Brooklyn Robins. In his career, he hit .287 (1,195-for-4,171) with 18 home runs and 300 RBI. He was the last surviving person to have played on the 1923 New York Yankees championship team, the first year the Yankees won the World Series.

Witt was well known for having been knocked unconscious by a thrown soda bottle at a game in Sportsman's Park in St. Louis in 1922. The Yankees were locked in a tight pennant race with the St. Louis Browns that year. The person who threw the bottle from the stands was never identified, though the Yankees and Witt came back to win the series (thanks to a key hit by Witt) defeating the Browns by one game for the pennant.

External links

Major League Baseball outfielders
Philadelphia Athletics players
New York Yankees players
Brooklyn Robins players
Kansas City Blues (baseball) players
Mission Reds players
Reading Keystones players
Bowdoin Polar Bears baseball players
Baseball players from Massachusetts
People from Orange, Massachusetts
1895 births
1988 deaths
American people of Polish descent